A Legend in My Time is the fourth studio album by American country music artist Ronnie Milsap, released in 1975. Two singles were released from the album, including the Don Gibson penned "(I'd Be) A Legend in My Time," which reached No. 1 on country charts and Al Dexter's "Too Late to Worry, Too Blue to Cry", which peaked at #6.

The album reached No. 4 on Country charts and made its debut on the Billboard 200 chart, peaking at #138. Allmusic stated that the tempo was "switched up" "a little" from the previous album, marking it as having a bit more "variety." In 1975, it was named as the Country Music Association's Album of the Year.

Track listing

Personnel
Ronnie Milsap - lead vocals
The Nashville Edition - backing vocals
Bobby Thompson - banjo
Mike Leech - bass
Kenny Malone - drums
Jim Buchanan, Tommy Williams - fiddle
Harold Bradley, Jimmy Capps, Steve Gibson, Glenn Keener, Jerry Shook, Chip Young - guitar
Charlie McCoy - harmonica
Ronnie Milsap, Hargus "Pig" Robbins, Jay Spell - piano
Pete Drake, Lloyd Green, John Hughey - steel guitar
Bergen White - string arrangements (tracks 2,3,7,9)
Joe Zinkan - upright bass
Charlie McCoy, Farrell Morris - vibraphone
Technical
Al Pachucki, Bill Vandervort - recording engineer
Raeanne Rubenstein - photography

Charts

Singles

References
Erlewine, Stephen. [ Legend in My Time], Allmusic.

1975 albums
Ronnie Milsap albums
RCA Records albums